Manuel Gasparini (born 19 May 2002) is an Italian footballer who plays as a goalkeeper for  club Potenza.

Club career
Gasparini was included in The Guardian's "Next Generation 2019".

On 9 July 2021, he joined Pro Vercelli on loan from Udinese.

On 26 August 2021, he was loaned to Legnago Salus. On 31 January 2022, the loan was terminated early.

On 26 July 2022, Gasparini moved to Potenza.

Club statistics

Club

References

2002 births
Living people
People from San Daniele del Friuli
Footballers from Friuli Venezia Giulia
Italian footballers
Italy youth international footballers
Association football goalkeepers
Udinese Calcio players
F.C. Pro Vercelli 1892 players
F.C. Legnago Salus players
Potenza Calcio players
Serie A players
Serie C players